Pablo Jesús Camacho Figueira (born 12 December 1990) is a Venezuelan footballer who plays for Deportivo Táchira.

Career 
Camacho began his career with Deportivo Italia and signed in May 2009 with FC Caracas, before moved on 13 June 2009 to R.C.D. Espanyol the Venezuelan defender joined on loan from FC Caracas, the loan deal runs between 30 June 2010.

International career 
Camacho is also member of the Venezuela national under-20 football team and was presented in his homeland at 2009 FIFA U-20 World Cup in Egypt.

References

1990 births
Living people
Footballers from Caracas
Venezuelan footballers
Venezuela international footballers
Association football defenders
Caracas FC players
Deportivo Italia players
RCD Espanyol B footballers
Aragua FC players
Deportivo Anzoátegui players
Deportivo La Guaira players
Deportivo Táchira F.C. players
Venezuelan expatriate footballers
Expatriate footballers in Spain
Venezuelan expatriate sportspeople in Spain